Summer With Extra Month is a 1987 Mongolian romantic film based on the novel of Sorogdogiin Jargalsaikhan. The film was directed by Jamyansürengiin Selengesüren and starred Dogmidyn Sosorbaram, Ochibatyn Oyun and Sevjidiin Selenge. The story depicts the life of Galaa, a native of Lake Khövsgol, a blusterous, helpful young man set in a background of the late 1980s in the Mongolia.

Cast 
Dogmidyn Sosorbaram as Galbadrakh (Galaa)
Ochirbatyn Oyun as Ariunaa
Sevjidiin Selenge as Davaajav
J. Jigjiddulam as Serchmaa
Nasanbayaryn Nergüibaatar as Dagva
B. Chuluuntsend as Dorjbat

External links 
 Илүү сартай зун (1987) киноны тойм, трэйлер, уран бүтээлчид ... (Mongolian)

1987 films
1980s romance films
Mongolian drama films
Mongolian-language films
Seafaring films